Almonty Industries is a global mining company focused on tungsten mining and exploration. Its primary operations are in Spain, Portugal,  and South Korea. The company is listed on the Toronto Stock Exchange.

History
The name Almonty Industries derives from the names of the fathers of two of the founders as a tribute to them. "Al" comes from Al D'Amato, father of Daniel D'Amato and Monty from Monty Black, father of Lewis Black. Some Almonty partners had contact with tungsten production and trading from other projects in Thailand. Later, in May 2005, Almonty acquired Panasqueira mine in Portugal on behalf of Primary Metals Inc, a company formerly listed on the TSX Venture Exchange with the ticker symbol "PMI.V", purchased by Sojitz Corporation in 2008.

The company was formed in 2011 with the acquisition of Los Santos mine. It began trading on the TSX venture exchange on 28 September 2011. In March 2013 the company acquired an option on 51% of the Valtreixal deposit in northern Spain. In 2015 Almonty acquired Woulf Mining Corp. and its Sangdong project. In early 2016 Almonty acquired Panasqueira mine from Sojitz Corporation of Japan. In early 2017 Almonty received final permits for construction of its Sangdong mine and acquired the remainder of the Valtreixal project, thus gaining full ownership.

Timeline
2005 - May: Primary Metals (PMI.V on TSX) acquires Panasqueira
2008 - Sojitz acquires Primary Metals
2011 - Almonty Industries founded
28 September - began trading on TSX
2013 - March: Almonty acquires 51% of Valtreixal
2015 - acquires Woulf Mining and Sangdong project
2016 - acquires Panasqueria from Sojitz, also remaining Valtreixal ownership.

Operations

Spain

Los Santos
Los Santos Mine is exploited through Daytal Resources Spain S.L. ("Daytal"), a wholly owned Spanish subsidiary of Almonty Industries Inc. It is located in the municipalities of Los Santos and Fuenterroble de Salvatierra in the province of Salamanca, about 180 km west of Madrid.

The deposit was discovered by Billiton Española in 1979–1980 by targeted night use of ultra-violet lamps to disclose the presence of the tungsten mineral, scheelite (CaWO4) which fluoresces under ultraviolet light. After the discovery, a period of intense exploration activity began, including diamond drilling and some preliminary engineering. In the 1980s it decided to carry out a pre-feasibility study. By 1985, however, the prevailing price for tungsten of US$81/mtu, the project was considered non-viable. Later mining rights were acquired by the publicly owned company SIEMCALSA, which sold it to the Australian public company, Heemskirk Consolidated Limited that had commissioned the project in June 2008.

The Los Santos deposit is a typical skarn-hosted scheelite deposit, where intrusion of granitoids into carbonate-rich sedimentary rocks has resulted in their replacement by calcosilicate or siliceous minerals, together with mineralisation. It forms from impure carbonates rich in iron (Fe) and contains pyroxene, scheelite, plagioclase and locally magnetite. The scheelite is generally fine-grained, less than 1mm in size, but individual crystals may exceed 1 cm.

The mine works the mineralized skarn layers in eight zones (Cortinas West, Cortinas East, Capa 4, Sector Central, Gapa G, Peña de Hierro, Santos West and Santos South) that defines individual open pits. The pits are usually exploited in sets of two or three to rationalize mine costs and homogenize plant feed characteristics. The exploitation methodology is by transfer, in which the waste from the active pits is used for environmental restoration of the exhausted pits.

The Mineral processing plant has an approximate capacity of 500,000 tons per year and works by gravimetry. It produces tungsten (scheelite) concentrates with 65% WO3 at an average of 100-140 ton per month. Since 2008, Los Santos has produced approximately 8,500 tons of tungsten concentrate, making it, in terms of production, the biggest tungsten mine in Spain, taking into consideration all historical producers. The tailings of the processing plant are dry-stacked for subsequent re-processing, as much of its contained mineralization is not extracted and in the future, with changes in plant design, will be reprocessed; then the final tailings will be dumped into the restoration of the last pit shell.

Valtreixal
Exploration works followed in 1974–1986 and the first reference to the presence of tungsten dates from this time.

Almonty optioned the property between 2013 and the full acquisition in 2016. During this period a large amount of exploration and metallurgical tests were done by Almonty under its wholly owned subsidiary Valtreixal Resources. The deposit is about 8 km north of the border between Portugal and Spain in the municipality of Pedralba de la Praderia and 320 km NE of Madrid.

Current resources are 2.82 million tons @ 0.25% tungsten trioxide (WO3) and 0.13% tin (Sn) in the indicated category and 15.42 Mt @ 0.08% WO3 + 0.12% Sn as inferred resources. Mineral reserves in the probable category are 2.55 Mt @ 0.25% WO3 and 0.12% Sn. This is enough for the 5-year initial open pit project with the 500,000 t per year capacity, while the push back of the open pit to the east is defined. The project will produce about 770 to 1,300 t of tungsten concentrates and about 500 to 620 t of tin concentrates per year.

Portugal

Panasqueira 
Panasqueira is a tungsten mine that has been worked almost continuously for 130 years. In terms of accumulated production it is probably the second-biggest tungsten mine in the world. Based on reliable records for 1934 to 2016, 40 million tons of ore were extracted and 128,110 tons of WO3 concentrate produced, 6,576 tons of tin concentrates and 32,410 tons of copper concentrate. Its tungsten concentrate (wolframite) is a reference in the market, as its high grade has the fewest impurities commercially available in the market, usually receiving from the customers a premium for its quality. Aggregates for civil construction and minerals are also sold. The minerals of Panasqueira mine are famous for their size, perfection and rarity, including two that are only found in this deposit ( and :wikt:thadeuite).

The deposit is a sheeted vein system of great dimensions, and some authors consider it a world-class deposit. It stretches along three municipalities (Covilhã, Pampilhosa da Serra and Fundão) and so far has discovered two non-outcropping intrusive sources (one in Fundão and the other in Covilhã). During Sojitz Corporation management (2007–2015) deep drilling was performed to identify other mineralization sources (granite/greisen cupolas) with no result. Presently new exploration work is being performed southeast of the mine with the same objective. The exploitation zone actually active stretches in approximately 2,500m in length; 400m to 2,200m in width and at least 500m in depth. The mine is presently active in levels 1, 2 and 3. It extracts between 700,000 and 800,000 t of ore per year and produces between 100 and 120 t of tungsten concentrates per month and other byproducts. Tin is increasing in importance as exploitation zones progresses towards mixed tungsten-tin vein zones. Total reserves are enough for 2.5 years and resources for 30 years.

South Korea

Sangdong
Tungsten mineralisation was discovered on the property in 1916, but the main Sangdong deposit was discovered in 1939–1940. The Sangdong Mine was operated during World War II by Sorim Resources Co. and from 1946 to 1949 under the jurisdiction of the United States military government office. The mine operated until 1992, with annual rates of production of up to 600,000 tons of ore. By the time it closed, the mine had been developed on twenty levels. Sangdong achieved an enormous importance and in some years, before the present boom in the South Korean economy, it represented more than half of total South Korean exports. POSCO, the 4th steel producing corporation of the world, which was born as a branch company of the former Sangdong mine corporation (KTMC), is presently doing the detail engineering to restart Sangdong Mine. Historical production at Sangdong was enormous (94,470 t of WO3 recorded between 1952 and 1987) and it was probably the third-biggest tungsten producer in the world, only after Tyrnyauz in Russia and Panasqueira. It also produced relevant yearly amounts of molybdenum, bismuth and gold as byproducts.
The mine closed in 1992 due to Chinese dumping and reverted to the state. It was applied in 2006. After the acquisition in 2015 by Almonty, the project was subject to reengineering and is now in the detail engineering phase, with financing closing in October 2020. It is expected to open during the first half of 2022 with a capacity of 640,000 tons per year and will produce on average 4,000 tons of tungsten concentrate per year with bismuth and molybdenum as byproducts.

The deposit is composed of:
The hanging-wall mineralization that reaches up to 70m true thicknesses.
The Main zone which is the higher-grade zone and where most of the historical exploitation took place.
The 5 footwall mineralized layers. Mainly explored are numbers 2 and 3 with average thicknesses above 4m.
The molybdenum stockwork that is a large deposit underlying the footwall structures.

The deposit is huge with high grade. The zones currently recognized have indicated resources of 8 million tons @ 0.51% WO3 and 50.6 million t @ 0.43% WO3 in Inferred resources. The reserves are only established in the zones where exploitation will start and are enough for 12 years of exploitation.

Gallery

References

External links 
Tungsten Industry
Tungsten
Tungsten has been identified by British Geological Surveys (BGS) as a Critical Mineral.
Tungsten Fact Sheet
Almonty Korea Tungsten - The Pride of Korea is Returning
Almonty Korea Tungsten (Sangdong Mine) paves way to a New Era in the Tungsten Industry
Sangdong Tungsten Mine Project 1st Video
Sangdong Tungsten Mine Project 2nd Video

Metal companies of Canada
Companies based in Toronto
Canadian companies established in 2011
Companies listed on the Toronto Stock Exchange
Companies formerly listed on the TSX Venture Exchange
Tungsten mining
Non-renewable resource companies established in 2011